Lalu Alex is an Indian actor who works in Malayalam cinema. In a career spanning four decades, Lalu Alex has acted over 250 movies and is known for his character roles, comic roles and antagonistic roles in the Malayalam movie industry.

Lalu Alex started his acting career as a supporting actor in the movie Ee Ganam Marakkumo in 1978 and associated with notable movies in his earlier career including Idi Muzhakkam, Nayattu (directed by Sreekumaran Thampi), Meen, Thushaaram and Thrishna. He has also acted in three Tamil movies.

Early life and family 
Lalu Alex was born as the second child among three children to Chandy and Annamma at Piravom, Muvattupuzha Taluk. He has an elder brother, Roy and a younger sister, Laila. Lalu Alex has been married to Betty since 1986. They have three children named Ben Lalu Alex, Sen Lalu Alex and Ciya Lalu Alex. Ben acted in the Malayalam movie Orkut Oru Ormakoot.

Career
He started his career in the movie Ee Gaanam Marakkumo in 1978. He was able to work in I. V. Sasi's significant films such as Thrishna, Thusharam, and Ahimsa. His appeared in I.V.Sasi's Ee Nadu, playing the role of SP Alexander. After that he acted in villainous character roles in films like I.V.Sasi's Kanamarayath, Alkootathil Thaniye, John Jaffer Janardhanan, Mrugaya, Balachandra Menon's Karyam Nissaram, and Prasnam Gurutharam. Director Joshiy gave Lalu Alex roles in films like Aa Ratri, Bhookambam, Alakadalin Akkare, Minimol Vathikanil, Muhurtham 11.30 and Nair Saab. He has worked with directors such as K. Madhu in Moonam Mura (as Charles),Adikkurippu,Orukkam, Chathurangam. He also worked with Sathyan Anthikkad in Kalikkalam Oral Mathram and Kamal in Manjupole Oru Penkutty and Niram. In the 1990s, Lalu Alex turned to comic roles.

Alex's use of comedy, dialogue, delivery, and performance skill has rendered him as a notable figure in the industry. Lalu Alex and actor Kunchako Boban often appear in films together.

Partial filmography

Malayalam

Tamil

Awards

Kerala State Film Award 
2004 Kerala State Film Award for Second Best Actor - Manjupoloru Penkutti

Kerala Film Critics Award 
 2003 - Second best actor - Manjupole oru penkutty

Asianet Film Awards 
 2009 Best Actor in a Villain Role – Evidam Swargamanu

Amrita Mathrubhumi Film Awards 
 2009 Best Villain — Lalu Alex for Evidam Swargamanu

Other awards 
 2010 Kala Ratnam Award of KALA Abu Dhabi
 2014 Abhinaya Keerthi Puraskaram for his momentous contribution to the Malayalam film industry by Ernakulam District Pravasi Association (EDPA) Riyadh, Saudi Arabia as part of Metro Fest 2014

References

External links 
 http://en.msidb.org/displayProfile.php?category=actors&artist=Lalu%20Alex&limit=182

Male actors from Kerala
Living people
1954 births
Male actors in Malayalam cinema
Indian male film actors
Kerala State Film Award winners
People from Muvattupuzha
20th-century Indian male actors
21st-century Indian male actors